Gao Jinsong (born August 1963) is a former Chinese politician who spent most of his career in Southwest China's Yunnan province. He was investigated by the Communist Party of China's anti-graft agency in April 2015. Previously he served as the Communist Party Secretary of Kunming.

Gao was a delegate to the 11th National People's Congress.

Life and career
Gao was born and raised in Luxi County, Yunnan. He graduated from Yunnan University, majoring in foreign-related economic management.

In July 1996 - March 1998 he was Deputy Head of Wuhua District, a district under the jurisdiction of Kunming, and soon became its head. From January 2008 to December 2012 he served as Deputy Communist Party Secretary and Mayor of Yuxi

In December 2012, he was promoted to become Communist Party Secretary of Qujing, he remained in that position until August 2014, when he was transferred to Kunming, capital of Yunan province, and appointed Communist Party Secretary, the top political position in that city.

Downfall
On April 10, 2015, the state media reported that he was placed under investigation. On the same day, he was dismissed for corruption. Zhao was the third consecutive Kunming party leader to be investigated for corruption or disciplinary offenses. His predecessors Zhang Tianxin and Qiu He were both investigated.

On August 3, 2016, he was expelled from the Communist Party of China (CPC). In October, his case was transferred to the procuratorate for further investigation and prosecution. On December 27, he stood trial for bribery at the Intermediate People's Court of Lincang. 

On February 24, 2017, he was sentenced to 10 years and fined 1.3 million yuan.

References

1963 births
Chinese Communist Party politicians from Yunnan
Living people
Political office-holders in Yunnan
Yunnan University alumni
People's Republic of China politicians from Yunnan
Mayors of places in China
People from Honghe